Statistics of Ekstraklasa for the 1998–99 season.

Overview
A total of 16 teams competed in the 1998–99 season. Wisła Kraków won the championship.

League table

Results

Top goalscorers

References

External links
 Poland – List of final tables at RSSSF 

Ekstraklasa seasons
Poland
1998–99 in Polish football